The 2012 TEAN International was a professional tennis tournament played on clay courts. It was the 17th edition of the tournament which was part of the 2012 ATP Challenger Tour and the 12th edition of the tournament for the 2012 ITF Women's Circuit. It took place in Alphen aan den Rijn, Netherlands between 3 and 9 September 2011.

ATP singles main draw entrants

Seeds

 1 Rankings are as of August 27, 2012.

Other entrants
The following players received wildcards into the singles main draw:
  Jeroen Benard
  Stephan Fransen
  Antal van der Duim
  Nick van der Meer

The following players received entry from the qualifying draw:
  Philip Davydenko
  Bastian Knittel
  James McGee
  Gerald Melzer

WTA singles main draw entrants

Seeds

 1 Rankings are as of August 27, 2012.

Other entrants
The following players received wildcards into the singles main draw:
  Chayenne Ewijk 
  Lesley Kerkhove 
  Quirine Lemoine
  Angelique van der Meet

The following players received entry from the qualifying draw:
  Eva Fernández-Brugués
  Andrea Gámiz
  Sofia Kvatsabaia
  Justine Ozga
  Katarzyna Piter
  Arina Rodionova
  Janina Toljan
  Anna Zaja

Champions

Men's singles

 Thiemo de Bakker def.  Simon Greul, 6–4, 6–2

Women's singles

 Sandra Záhlavová def.  Lesley Kerkhove, 7–5, 7–6(7–5)

Men's doubles

 Rameez Junaid /  Simon Stadler def.  Simon Greul /  Bastian Knittel, 4–6, 6–1, [10–5]

Women's doubles

 Diana Buzean /  Daniëlle Harmsen def.  Corinna Dentoni /  Justine Ozga, 6–2, 6–0

External links
Official Website

TEAN International
TEAN International
TEAN International
2012 in Dutch tennis